Alexander Martonffy (born 7 May 1919) was an Australian fencer. He competed at the 1956 and 1964 Summer Olympics. He was a longstanding member of the Melbourne-based VRI Fencing Club.

References

External links
 

1919 births
Year of death missing
Australian male fencers
Olympic fencers of Australia
Fencers at the 1956 Summer Olympics
Fencers at the 1964 Summer Olympics
Commonwealth Games medallists in fencing
Commonwealth Games silver medallists for Australia
Fencers at the 1958 British Empire and Commonwealth Games
20th-century Australian people
Medallists at the 1958 British Empire and Commonwealth Games